Badlesmere is a village and civil parish in the Swale district of Kent, England, and about five miles south of Faversham.

It was once called Basmere.
There has been a recorded settlement (under the name 'Badelesmere') as far back as the Domesday Book. Which also mentioned that in the time of King Edward the Confessor, the parish was worth sixty shillings. The manor was previously owned by Odo, Earl of Kent (as the Bishop of Bayeux), but following his trial (for fraud) in 1076 his assets were re-apportioned, including Badlesmere. The abbot of St. Augustine's then claimed this manor.

During the reign of King Richard I (1157–1199), the manor was held by 'Guncelin de Badlesmere', who had accompanied the king during his Siege of Acon in Palestine. The manor passed through several generations of the Badlesmere family, including, Gunselm de Badlesmere (Justice of Chester and Cheshire 1232 – 1301) and 'Bartholomew de Badlesmere' (governor of Leeds Castle) after November 1317). He then obtained the king's licence to found a Priory on his lands. But nothing came to this licence.

In 1523, Sir Thomas Randolph (an eminent statesman during the reign Queen Elizabeth I), was born here.

The church, dedicated to St Leonard, is a grade II* listed Anglican church, described as "interesting as a small, quite unremarkable church" which was not 'restored' in the Victorian era. Its interior is 13th century and 18th century. It has a complete set of Georgian box pews. In 1887, J.C.L. Stahlschmidt reported that the bell hanging in the church was one of those made in 1635 by Joseph Hatch for St Mary's Church, Reculver; the church at Reculver was demolished in 1809.

The village green, known as Badlesmere Lees, lies off the main road between the towns of Faversham and Ashford.

The parish has been linked for many years with that of Leaveland, whose mediaeval church, which is very different from Badlesmere. It has a crown-post roof and a 16th-century monument to a local family survived the Victorian restoration.

In popular culture

Badlesmere is used in The Meaning of Liff (book by Douglas Adams) to define "Someone who dishonestly ticks the "I have read the terms and conditions" box on a website".

Author Russell Hoban repurposes Badlesmere as "Bad Mercy" in his 1980, post apocalyptic novel Riddley Walker.

References

Bibliography

External links
 
 

Villages in Kent
Civil parishes in Kent